Mohd Sabre bin Mat Abu (born 8 August 1987) is a Malaysian footballer who last plays for Sarawak as a right back.

Sabre was a member of Malaysia U23 and Malaysia U20 squad. He is known for his high work rate and versatility as he can be deployed as fullback, midfielder, winger and even as a striker.

Club career
Sabre was promoted to the senior after the 2006 SUKMA where Azraai Khor scout his potential alongside his teammates Baddrol Bakhtiar, Khyril Muhymeen, Shafiq Jamal, Bunyamin Umar and Hadi Hamid from national Malaysia U20.

International career
For international appearance, Sabre earned his first call-up in 2005 to the Malaysia U20 squad of K. Rajagopal's side in AFC Youth Championship 2006 qualifying and final round in Bangalore, India. He later taken into the Malaysia U23 squad for 2008 Olympic Games qualification.

In November 2010, Sabre was called up to the Malaysia national squad by coach K. Rajagopal for the 2010 AFF Suzuki Cup. Malaysia won the 2010 AFF Suzuki Cup title for the first time in their history.

Career statistics

Club

Honours

Club
Kedah
 Malaysia Cup (3): 2007, 2008, 2016
 Malaysia Super League (2): 2006–2007, 2007–2008
 FA Cup Malaysia (2): 2007, 2008
 Malaysia Premier League (1): 2005–06

PDRM
Malaysia Premier League (1): 2014

International
Malaysia
 AFF Championship: 2010

References
 RSSSF-Malaysia 2005

External links
 Profile at doha-2006.com
 

1987 births
Living people
Malaysian people of Malay descent
Malaysian footballers
Malaysia international footballers
People from Perak
Sarawak FA players
Kedah Darul Aman F.C. players
Association football fullbacks